Sir William Strickland, 4th Baronet  (c. 16861 September 1735), of Boynton, East Riding of Yorkshire, was an English landowner and Whig politician, who sat in the House of Commons from 1708 to 1735. He was a Government Minister in Sir Robert Walpole's administration.

Strickland was the eldest son of Sir William Strickland of Boynton, a Yorkshire landowner and Member of Parliament, and his wife Elizabeth Palmes.

At the 1708 British general election Strickland's father, who for some years had been MP for the local borough of Malton, was instead chosen as Member for Yorkshire – a much more prestigious constituency – and Strickland took his place representing Malton. From the first he was a loyal Whig and was recognised as a strong speaker.

Strickland remained MP for Malton until 1715, then represented Carlisle from 1715 to 1722 and finally Scarborough for the remaining thirteen years of his life.

Strickland inherited the baronetcy and Boynton Hall near Scarborough on his father's death in 1724. He became a friend of Robert Walpole and held a succession of junior posts. He was a Lord of the Treasury from 1725 to 1727, and also became Treasurer of the Household to the Queen. In 1729 he chaired a Parliamentary Committee on reform of the legal profession. In 1730, when Walpole reconstructed his government and promoted Henry Pelham to be Paymaster-General, Strickland was chosen to take his place as Secretary at War (arguably the most important ministerial post outside the cabinet), and was made a Privy Counsellor. This post he held until forced to retire by ill health in May 1735.

Away from Parliament, Sir William spent a considerable sum on ambitious alterations to Boynton Hall, commissioning Lord Burlington to design a new frontage and William Kent to design the interiors. However, when he returned from London to view the work he found to his fury that the local builders had failed to follow Lord Burlington's instructions, and the rebuilt hall bore little resemblance to the plans, in particular having an "old-fashioned roof" instead of the fashionable Palladian style he had been expecting!

Srickland died on 1 September 1735 at Boynton. He had married Catherine Sambrooke, daughter of Sir Jeremy Sambrooke, by settlement dated 9 March 1723. They had one son – George, who succeeded him in the baronetcy – and one daughter. His wife outlived him by more than thirty years, dying on 9 February 1767.

References

J Foster, Pedigrees of the County Families of Yorkshire (1874)
G R Park, The Parliamentary Representation of Yorkshire (1886)
Victoria County History of the East Riding of Yorkshire
Memorial inscription, Boynton Church, Yorkshire

1680s births
1735 deaths
Members of the Privy Council of Great Britain
Strickland, Sir William, 4th Baronet
Members of the Parliament of Great Britain for English constituencies
Whig (British political party) MPs
People from Bridlington
British MPs 1708–1710
British MPs 1710–1713
British MPs 1713–1715
British MPs 1715–1722
British MPs 1722–1727
British MPs 1727–1734
British MPs 1734–1741
Members of the Parliament of Great Britain for Carlisle